Adjuma, adjoema, aji umba, or ojemma is a variety of Capsicum chinense chili pepper, originally from Brazil. The fruits are shaped like small bell peppers, colored red or yellow. This pepper is sometimes sold as Madame Jeanette, although that is a different variety.
Adjuma chilies are also very often sold as "habanero" or "Scotch bonnet", due to their similarity.

See also

List of Capsicum cultivars

References

Chili peppers
Capsicum cultivars